The uniform woodcreeper (Hylexetastes uniformis) is a species of bird in the Dendrocolaptinae subfamily. It was formerly considered as a subspecies of the red-billed woodcreeper (Hylexetastes perrotii). It is found in humid forest in the south-central Amazon of Bolivia and Brazil.

References

uniform woodcreeper
Birds of the Amazon Basin
Birds of Bolivia
uniform woodcreeper
Taxonomy articles created by Polbot
Taxobox binomials not recognized by IUCN